Second Programme (Deftero Programma) is the second public radio station of Greece's state broadcaster, ERT. The station consists of Greek music and culture broadcasts.

History
The Second Programme originated on May 11, 1952 as a result of an attempt at an alternative music and entertainment program, to the First Programme. It was originally broadcast at 666 kHz, later at 93.6 MHz FM, and still later carried on Kosmos 93.6. The station program focused at the outset on Greek music but also on theater performances. In 1987 it was renamed ERA 2. Ten years later, in 1997, it returned to the old name.

The second program, due to nationwide broadcast, was the top in ratings for musical radio in the region. Every year the station broadcasts live the Eurovision Song Contest, in cooperation with ERT1, which carries it on television.

After ERT
On June 11, 2013, after the government's decision Samara for the closure of ERT, the Second Program stopped functioning. From then until November 7 of the same year the station broadcast 4 hours to 24 hours from a single network of HR operating redundant workers ERT. On Monday 16 December the same year the Second Programme reopened ERT Open.

A year later, Monday, December 15, 2014, the Second Program started operating under the New Greek Radio, Internet and TV, the new operator of Greece that existed.

Back to ERT
On April 28 of 2015 was passed by Parliament by law to reopen ERT, which took place on June 11, 2015, two years after the black ERT and its replacement of NERIT. Specifically, NERIT was closed and ERT reopened with all the radios including the Second Programme. So the day started the relaunch, the station transmits again the ERT and the HR.

Hellenic Radio
Radio stations established in 1952